Anna Maria Kristina Sjöström Amcoff (born 23 April 1977) is a Swedish former football striker. She played for Umeå IK in the Damallsvenskan, winning two European Cups and five national championships before retiring in 2006.

She was a member of the Sweden women's national football team, taking part in the 2003 World Cup where Sweden won the silver medal, the 2004 Summer Olympics and the 2005 European Championship where she scored a winner against host England to qualify Sweden for the semifinals.

Personal life
Sjöström was born in Skellefteå, and now uses the surname Sjöström Amcoff.

Honours
 2 UEFA Women's Cups (2003, 2004)
 5 Swedish Leagues (2000, 2001, 2002, 2005, 2006)
 3 Swedish Cups (2001, 2002, 2003)

References

External links
Profile at Swedish Football Association 

1977 births
Living people
Swedish women's footballers
Footballers at the 2004 Summer Olympics
Olympic footballers of Sweden
Sweden women's international footballers
Umeå IK players
Damallsvenskan players
Women's association football forwards
2003 FIFA Women's World Cup players
People from Skellefteå Municipality
Sportspeople from Västerbotten County